The 2016–17 Würzburger Kickers season is their 2nd season in the 2. Bundesliga. They won promotion after beating MSV Duisburg in the 2015–16 2. Bundesliga Relegation play-offs.

Transfers

In

Out

Friendlies

2. Bundesliga

2. Bundesliga fixtures & results

League table

DFB-Pokal

Player informations
.

|}

Notes
1.Kickoff time in Central European Time/Central European Summer Time.
2.Würzburger Kickers goals first.

References

Würzburger Kickers seasons
Wurzburger Kickers